Hong-joo is a Korean unisex given name.

People with same name
Harold Hongju Koh (born 1954), Korean American lawyer and legal scholar

Fictional characters with this name include
Chae Hong-joo (aka Ueno Rie), in 2012 South Korean television series Bridal Mask
Nam Hong-joo, in 2017 South Korean television series While You Were Sleeping
Choi Hong-joo, in 2021 South Korean television series Mouse

See also
List of Korean given names

Korean unisex given names